MegaFault is a 2009 television disaster film by The Asylum, directed by David Michael Latt, starring Brittany Murphy, Justin Hartley, Eriq Lasalle, Tamala Jones, Paul Logan and Bruce Davison. It is one of the last films to feature Brittany Murphy, as she died some weeks after its premiere.

Plot 
In West Virginia, Charles "Boomer" Baxter is setting mountain-top depletion explosives.  He detonates the TNT, and an unprecedented earthquake devastates the area. A few hours later government seismologist Dr. Amy Lane arrives at the quake's epicenter.

She realizes that the quake has opened a deep fault running through the center of North America, ending at the San Andreas Fault. Any further instability will cause massive earthquakes and tsunamis, devastating Los Angeles, San Francisco and other cities all around the Pacific Ocean, leading to the deaths of millions.

Dr. Lane and Boomer chase just behind the expanding crack in the Earth's crust, developing a plan to stop the next quake. They decide to use a satellite orbiting above the continent which can trigger earthquakes. They fire it off when they reach the Grand Canyon, thinking that when the new fault hits the canyon it will be forced to turn south into the Gulf of Mexico. When the fault crosses with the canyon, they fire the satellite at the canyon but plan goes wrong. Instead of heading south, the fault travels north, towards the Yellowstone Caldera.

They realize that if the fault crosses the caldera it will explode, expelling several thousand tons of ash into the atmosphere, killing millions and causing a Volcanic winter. They decide to set explosives to block the fault's path. Later, when it reaches the park, Boomer detonates the explosives, causing the fault to stop just short of the volcano, but costing Boomer his life. In the end, an orbiting shot of the United States shows a giant canyon that stretches miles-wide across most of the continent.

Cast
 Brittany Murphy as Dr. Amy Lane
 Eriq La Salle as Charles "Boomer" Baxter
 Justin Hartley as Dan Lane
 Bruce Davison as Dr. Mark Rhodes
 Tamala Jones as Marlena Johnson
 Paul Logan as Major Boyd Grayson
 Dana Tomasko as Female Tech
 Anya Benton as Radio Dispatcher
 Jack P. Downing as General Banks
 Sarah Garvey as Jerry Blair
 A.J. Haut as Guard #1
 Sheila Heubach		
 Andrew Stephen Pratt as Officer Armstrong
 Miranda Schwien as Miranda Lane
 Jack Goldenberg as Sebastian

Production 

The film is a Sci Fi original film and is Brittany Murphy's final TV role as she died unexpectedly on December 20, 2009. It was all shot in the Quad Cities' Davenport, Iowa, with Davenport mayor Bill Gluba making a cameo appearance.

Soundtrack 
The soundtrack featured Victoria Mazze, Chris Ridenhour, and The Divine Madness.

Release 
It premiered on October 10, 2009 on the Syfy channel and was released on DVD on November 24, 2009. It premiered on December 10, 2010 in the UK on Sky Movies Premiere.

References

External links 
 
 AgonyBooth.com recap of MegaFault

2009 television films
2009 films
2009 direct-to-video films
2009 science fiction action films
2000s adventure films
2009 independent films
The Asylum films
American science fiction action films
American disaster films
Films about earthquakes
Films set in the United States
Films directed by David Michael Latt
2000s English-language films
2000s American films